Punjab Control of Organised Crime Act,  (PCOCA) is law to be enacted by Punjab state in India to combat organised crime. It is in process of approval as the Punjab Cabinet has yet not given its approval on account of few reservations about various clauses of the Act.The Act is designed on the pattern of Maharashtra Control of Organised Crime Act enacted in 1999.

References

State legislation in India
Crime in Punjab, India
Government of Punjab, India
Proposed laws of India
Organised crime in India
Acts related to organized crime